Silvino Bracho (born July 17, 1992) is a Venezuelan professional baseball pitcher in the Cincinnati Reds organization. Bracho was signed by the Arizona Diamondbacks in 2011 as an amateur free agent. He has previously played in MLB for the Diamondbacks and Atlanta Braves.

Professional career

Arizona Diamondbacks
Bracho was signed by the Arizona Diamondbacks on August 9, 2011, as an amateur free agent. He began his professional career in 2012 with the Dominican Summer League Diamondbacks. He reached Class A in 2014 with the South Bend Silver Hawks, where he compiled a 3–2 win–loss record with a league-leading 26 saves and a 2.08 earned run average (ERA), and was a Midwest League post-season All Star. He reached Double-A in 2015, with the Mobile BayBears.

Bracho was called up to the majors for the first time on August 30, 2015. He collected an ERA of 1.46 in 13 appearances during the 2015 season. He made the Opening Day roster at the start of the 2016 season, but after the game was optioned to Triple-A. He was recalled on April 20. For the season, he collected an ERA of 7.30 in 26 major-league appearances. In 2017, he spent the majority of the season in Triple-A, appearing only in 21 MLB games, in which he recorded a 5.66 ERA. In 2018, he posted an ERA of 3.19 in 31 MLB games.

In March 2019, Bracho suffered a torn UCL and underwent Tommy John surgery, missing the entire 2019 season as a result. In the shortened 2020 season, Bracho only pitched in one inning on the year in a game against the Colorado Rockies, surrendering a two-run home run to Ryan McMahon. On October 27, 2020, Bracho was outrighted off of the 40-man roster, and elected free agency.

San Francisco Giants
On November 11, 2020, Bracho signed a minor-league contract with the San Francisco Giants organization. During the 2021 season, Bracho played exclusively for the Giants' Triple-A affiliate, the Sacramento River Cats.

Boston Red Sox
On March 6, 2022, Bracho signed a minor-league deal with the Boston Red Sox. He began the season in Triple-A with the Worcester Red Sox, until accompanying the major-league squad to Toronto for a series in late June. Bracho was added to Boston's active roster on June 28. He was designated for assignment two days later, without making an appearance for the team.

Atlanta Braves
On June 30, 2022, Bracho was traded to the Atlanta Braves for cash considerations. He was promoted to the active roster and made his debut with the team on July 1. He was designated for assignment on July 4 after just one appearance. The Braves outrighted Bracho to the Triple-A Gwinnett Stripers on July 6. On September 28, Bracho was again promoted to the active roster. On November 18, he was non tendered and became a free agent.

Cincinnati Reds
On December 7, 2022, Bracho signed a minor league deal with the Cincinnati Reds that included an invite to spring training.

International career
Bracho has played for Águilas del Zulia of the Liga Venezolana de Béisbol Profesional (LVBP) during multiple winter seasons. He has also played for Venezuela in the 2017 World Baseball Classic, the 2021 Caribbean Series, and the 2022 Caribbean Series.

See also
 List of Major League Baseball players from Venezuela

References

External links

 

1992 births
Living people
Águilas del Zulia players
Arizona Diamondbacks players
Atlanta Braves players
Dominican Summer League Diamondbacks players
Venezuelan expatriate baseball players in the Dominican Republic
Major League Baseball pitchers
Major League Baseball players from Venezuela
Missoula Osprey players
Mobile BayBears players
Reno Aces players
South Bend Silver Hawks players
Sportspeople from Maracaibo
Venezuelan expatriate baseball players in the United States
Visalia Rawhide players
Worcester Red Sox players
World Baseball Classic players of Venezuela
2017 World Baseball Classic players
2023 World Baseball Classic players